This is a List of Anti-aircraft co-operation units of the Royal Air Force.

Anti-Aircraft Co-operation Units 

 Anti-Aircraft Co-operation Flight RAF (1931–36) became Anti-Aircraft Co-operation Unit RAF 
 Anti-Aircraft Co-operation Flight, Indian Air Force Volunteer Reserve (1941–42) became No. 1 Anti-Aircraft Co-operation Flight, Indian Air Force Volunteer Reserve 
 No. 1 Anti-Aircraft Co-operation Flight, Indian Air Force Volunteer Reserve (1942) became No. 1 Anti-Aircraft Co-operation Unit, Indian Air Force 
 No. 2 Anti-Aircraft Co-operation Flight, Indian Air Force Volunteer Reserve (1942) became No. 2 Anti-Aircraft Co-operation Unit, Indian Air Force 
 No. 3 Anti-Aircraft Co-operation Flight, Indian Air Force Volunteer Reserve (1942) became No. 3 Anti-Aircraft Co-operation Unit, Indian Air Force

References

Citations

Bibliography

Anti-Aircraft
Air defence units and formations